Limatambo International Airport  was the international airport of Lima until 1960, when was replaced by the Jorge Chávez International Airport. Today, the terminal is the headquarters of the Ministry of the Interior of Peru, and the runways are incorporated within the city as the Guardia Civil and José Gálvez Barrenechea avenues.

External links
1962 diagram of Limatambo
Del Aeropuerto de Limatambo al actual Aeropuerto Internacional Jorge Chávez
Gallery of pictures of Limatambo airport

Defunct airports
Airports disestablished in 1960
Buildings and structures in Lima
Airports in Peru
Year of establishment missing